Viola M. Gale ( Håkansson; 1917 – 2007) was a Swedish-born American poet and publisher, who worked in the United States state of Oregon. She began writing poems and short stories that were published in minor magazines and reviews in the 1950s. Gale's first book was published in 1959, and released five more throughout her life. In 1974, she established the small printing house Prescott Street Press in Portland to promote unknown authors and produce well-designed affordable books. One of Gale's works was selected by the Oregon Cultural Heritage Commission to be one of 100 Oregon books from 1800 to 2000 that "best representing the state's literary heritage" in 2003.

Early life
Gale was born Viola Håkansson in 1917, in a rural village called Noret along Central Sweden's Västerdal River in Dalarna County. She was the daughter of Erland G. Håkansson and Maria Håkansson. Gale had one brother. The family sold their belongings and moved to the United States in the final year of mass immigration from Sweden in 1923, when Gale was six years old. They came to the country via Ellis Island, and settled in the Swedish community of Clatskanie, Oregon, where her father worked as a wood logger for Simon Benson. Following graduation from Clatskanie High School in 1934, she worked as the Clatskanie librarian, and sold bread. Gale left Clatskanie in 1940 and moved to Portland. She became an naturalized United States citizen that same year, and began to attend literature and writing courses at the University of Colorado, Portland State University, Lewis & Clark College, and the University of Oregon in the late 1940s.

Career

Following the end of World War II, she found employment authoring product promotions and steadily started writing poems and short stories in the 1950s. Gale's work was published in minor magazines and reviews, and she won the Oregon Poetry Prize in 1954. In 1955, she met poet May Sarton at a writer's conference at the University of Colorado Boulder, and was encouraged by Sarton to continue writing poetry. Gale won the 1958 Swallow Press New Poetry Series Award. In 1959, she sent a poetry collection to publisher Alan Swallow, who became her mentor and brought out her first book, Several Houses, that year. Gale's second book, Love Always, followed six years later. Throughout the 1960s, she additionally connected with contemporaneously Swedish poetry and read it. Gale began teaching as director of creative writing workshops at the Young Women's Christian Association in 1962, was the writer-in-residence for Eastern Oregon College in 1968, and lectured at Clatsop Community College in 1969.

She authored Nineteen Ing Poems in 1970, then Clouded Sea a year later, and Clouded Sea in 1974. In 1974, Gale established the small publishing house Prescott Street Press, to promote unknown authors and produce affordable books that were well-designed. The publishing house received initial support from grants by the National Endowment for the Arts and had national distribution and helped to begin the career of several writers. Her final writing of poems, Odd Flowers & Short-Eared Owls, was self-published in 1984. Gale contributed to Colorado Quarterly, December, Kansas Magazine, Midwest Quarterly Review, Northwest Review, Poetry Northwest, Poetry (Chicago), Pacific Spectator among other publications. Her work was featured in the books Oregon Signatures in 1959, Golden Year: The Poetry Society of American Anthology in 1960, and NW Manuscript Poems in 1966.

Personal life

Gale married Jim Gale in 1942. She died in 2007, having lived the whole of her adult life in Oregon and having never went back to Sweden.

Method and legacy
The poems of Gale came from personal experiences and memories, with a few of them featuring Scandinavian recollections, and several displaying "a keen sense of place". She said she was highly encouraged by opening up American poetry by the Beat Generation. Through Gale's career, she wrote in a more experimental and relaxed away from "the slightly formal feel of the strict stanzaic patterns in her early work".

Her work, Several Houses, was selected as one of 100 Oregon books from 1800 to 2000 by the Oregon Cultural Heritage Commission as "best representing the state's literary heritage" in 2003. In February 2008, a celebration of the life and career of Gale took place in Portland and attended by several poets. The Lewis & Clark College Special Collections and Archives holds a collection relating to Gale. They include her biographical information, personal correspondence, photographs, poetry manuscripts, and teaching materials connected to her life and other materials about Prescott Street Press.

References

1917 births
2007 deaths
People from Dalarna County
Writers from Portland, Oregon
Poets from Oregon
Swedish emigrants to the United States
Naturalized citizens of the United States
University of Colorado alumni
Portland State University alumni
Lewis & Clark College alumni
University of Oregon alumni
Eastern Oregon University faculty
Swedish women poets
20th-century Swedish women writers
20th-century Swedish poets
American women poets
20th-century American women writers
21st-century American women writers
20th-century American poets
21st-century American poets
Women book publishers (people)
American book publishers (people)
Swedish book publishers (people)
American women academics